Rumen Lapantov (born 11 April 1984) is a Bulgarian football player, currently playing as a midfielder for Pirin Gotse Delchev.

On 12 August 2012, Lapantov scored Pirin's first-ever A PFG goal, in a two to one home win against Minyor Pernik.

References

External links

Living people
1984 births
Bulgarian footballers
Association football midfielders
OFC Vihren Sandanski players
OFC Pirin Blagoevgrad players
PFC Pirin Gotse Delchev players
FC Etar 1924 Veliko Tarnovo players
First Professional Football League (Bulgaria) players